Daming may refer to:

Daming County (大名县), in Hebei, China
Daming Lake (大明湖), in Jinan, Shandong, China
Daming Palace, an imperial palace complex of the Tang dynasty
Daming Temple, a temple located in Yangzhou, Jiangsu, China
Daming Town, name of several towns in China:
Daming, Daming County (大名镇), Hebei
Daming, Ningcheng County (大明镇), Chifeng, Inner Mongolia
Daming, Diaobingshan (大明镇), Liaoning
Daming, Hua County (大明镇), Shaanxi
Ming Dynasty (大明帝国), ruling dynasty of China from 1368 to 1644